Aspergillus cvjetkovicii is a species of fungus in the genus Aspergillus.

References

Further reading

cvjetkovicii
Fungi described in 2012